Ramesh Gulabrao Borde (22 February 1952 – 8 July 2021) was an Indian cricketer. He played 42 first-class matches and two List A matches between 1972–73 and 1984–85. His elder brother Chandu Borde was also a cricketer.

Career 
He made his first-class debut in 1972–73 domestic season for West Zone against Vidarbha where his elder brother Chandu Borde captained West Zone team. He was a regular feature for West Zone in Duleep Trophy between 1970s and 1980s. He also played for West Zone against the touring West Indies side in 1983–84 in Kolhapur. He played against Indian Board President's XI in two List A matches in 1982–83.

He also worked as a curator for Maharashtra Cricket Association and prepared pitches for the all three ODI matches between India and England in March 2021 at the MCA International Cricket Stadium.

Death 
He died on 8 July 2021 at the age of 69 due to heart attack.

See also 
 List of Maharashtra cricketers
 List of West Zone cricketers

References

External links 
 
 

1952 births
2021 deaths
Indian cricketers
Maharashtra cricketers
West Zone cricketers
Cricketers from Pune